The Journal of Unsolved Questions or JUnQ is an open access peer-reviewed scientific journal which publishes null results. Based in Mainz, Germany, it features articles from multiple disciplines.

History
Negative or null results are often not published by scientific journals, leading to other scientists unnecessarily repeating their colleagues' work. In order to make previous null results publicly available, scientists at the Johannes Gutenberg University Mainz established the Journal of Unsolved Questions in 2011.

References

Further reading

External links

 

2011 establishments in Germany
English-language journals
Multidisciplinary scientific journals
Publications established in 2011
Biannual journals
Johannes Gutenberg University Mainz